Henry is an unincorporated community on West Virginia Route 90 in northwestern Grant County, West Virginia, United States. Henry lies on Elk Creek shortly before its confluence with the North Branch Potomac River.   It is famous for the Henry Bicentennial Chicken Herding Competition.

The community was named after Henry G. Davis, a businessman in the mining industry.

References

Unincorporated communities in Grant County, West Virginia
Unincorporated communities in West Virginia
Populated places on the North Branch Potomac River